Walio is a Sepik language spoken in East Sepik Province, Papua-New Guinea. It is spoken in Walio village of Tunap/Hunstein Rural LLG in East Sepik Province.

References

Languages of East Sepik Province
Walio languages